OK-Junior is a kart racing class for top drivers aged 11 to 15 (drivers must reach the age of 12 within the first semester of calendar year).

This class used to be called Junior Intercontinental A (JICA or ICA-J) and has changed since January 2007 when CIK-FIA decided to replace the 100 cc air-cooled two-stroke engines with 125 cc Touch-and-Go (TaG) water-cooled two-stroke engines (KF type).The engines produce . The chassis and engines must be approved by the CIK-FIA. Minimum weight is 145 kg, including kart and driver.

Karts are equipped with an electric starter and clutch. The engine rpm is limited to 14,000 rpm.

It is one of the highest kart classes with national championships (perhaps with different tyre rules).

There is a European championship, a World Cup, as well as Oceania and Asia-Pacific championships. The Junior Monaco Kart Cup is taking place each year in this format.

For 2013 the class was renamed KF-Junior.

In 2016, the karts were completely re-designed by removing much of the electronics. The karts are now push started. The class was subsequently renamed OK-Junior, standing for Original Kart.

Champions

World

Europe

See also
 KF1, the top level of karting
 KF2, another KF1 feeder series besides KF3
 KZ1, the fastest KZ karting racing category
 KZ2, the second fastest KZ karting racing category
 Superkart, road racing with kart sized open-wheel cars
 Karting World Championship
 Karting European Championship

References

External links
 CIK-FIA – International Karting Governing Body

Kart racing series